Käku is a village in Saaremaa Parish, Saare County, Estonia, on the island of Saaremaa.

Before the administrative reform in 2017, the village was in Lääne-Saare Parish.

It has a population of 37.

One of two Saaremaa Motoklubi's motocross circuits is located in Käku.

References

Villages in Saare County